CivicPlus is a web development business headquartered in Manhattan, Kansas, United States, which specializes in "building city and county e-government communication systems." It was first developed by programming company Vanyon, a division of Networks Plus.

Its current parent company Icon Enterprises, Inc. began doing business in 1994.

Acquisitions 
In January 2017, CivicPlus acquired Rec1, a parks and reaction product. In October, it acquired BoardSync, an agenda and meeting-management product. In July 2018, CivicPlus acquired Virtual Towns & Schools, an open-source content management system. In October 2019, CivicPlus acquired SeeClickFix, a 311 citizen request tool.

In April 2021, CivicPlus acquired Municode (Municipal Code Corporation), a company that hosts codes for local governments.

In June 2022, CivicPlus completed the acquisition of Optimere, a digital compliance provider.

Websites developed
As of 2019, CivicPlus had helped design or augment over 4,000 local government websites. Several localities have hired the company firm:

Anaheim, California
Cheyenne, Wyoming
East Grand Forks, Minnesota
Eugene, Oregon
Flower Mound, Texas
Manassas, Virginia
Passaic County, New Jersey
Watertown, Massachusetts
Narragansett, Rhode Island
Princeton, Texas

Company products
CivicPlus products include the Citizen Request Tracker, the CivicPlus Content Management System, and the CivicReady Mass Notification system

In 2020, CivicPlus released CivicOptimize, a package centered on a low-code tool known as ''Productivity.'" The government IT staff who are acquainted with hand-coding can create personalized workflows, smartphone apps, and digital resources platform integrations.

References

External links
 CivicPlus website

Further reading
 

Manhattan, Kansas metropolitan area
Software companies based in Kansas
1998 establishments in Kansas
E-government in the United States
Software companies established in 1998
Software companies of the United States